Ophrah Shemesh (December 9, 1952) is an Israeli-American artist, best known for her intense, existentially themed oil and tempera paintings of women and men.

Early life and career
Born in Haifa, Israel, to Albert Shemesh and Carmella-Daisy Levy.  Albert was an important Lehi (Fighters for the Freedom of Israel) activist in Iraq, before the creation of the state of Israel.  Shemesh studied at the Bezalel Academy of Arts and Design in Jerusalem (1972-1976).

In 1973, Israeli filmmaker and director Amos Gitai  cast her in a short film, My Mother at the Seashore, and later gave her a leading role in Golem, the Spirit of Exile  (1991), also starring Hanna Schygulla, Sam Fuller, and Bernardo Bertolucci.

Shemesh attended the New York Studio School of Drawing, Painting and Sculpture (NYSS) from 1979-1983.  In 1986, she was one of a new group of teachers brought in by then dean, Bruce Gagnier, and has been a member of the faculty since.  In 2009, she was interviewed by Stanley Crouch as part of the NYSS Evening Lecture Series, "In Conversation with Stanley Crouch". Shemesh has also taught and spoken in a variety of other programs and symposia, including the Syracuse University College of Visual and Performing Arts, Kremer Pigments, the International School of Painting, Drawing and Sculpture, the Sicily Artist in Residence Program (SARP), and the College de France.

Shemesh’s work is in the permanent collection of Collezione Maramotti and appears in Mario Diacono (2012), Archetypes and Historicity: Painting and Other Radical Forms, 1995-2007, Ophrah Shemesh: Silence of the Sirens, 2008-2011, and Max Tomasinelli (2011), Portraits of Artists.

Solo exhibitions

Harms & Twombly, New York, NY, 2017
Freight & Volume, New York, NY, 2008
Stephen Wirtz Gallery, San Francisco, CA, 2003
Baumgartner Gallery, New York, NY, 2002
Guy McIntyre Gallery, New York, NY, 1997
Mario Diacono Gallery, Boston, MA, 1995
Galleria S.A.L.E.S., Rome, Italy, 1995
Galleria Philippe Daverio, Milan, Italy, 1992

Reviews
Tosi, Barbara, “Tanti Retratti di Divi Non Illustri,” La Repubblica, May 24, 1995.
Coen, Vittoria, “Ophrah Shemesh at Galleria S.A.L.E.S.,” Flash Art, 1995.
Sherman, Mary, “Ophrah Shemesh, Mario Diacono,” ARTnews, December 1995.
Ebony, David, “David Ebony’s Top Ten of 1997: Ophrah Shemesh at Guy McIntyre,” Artnet, December 23, 1997.
Gagnier, Bruce Mitchel, “Ophrah Shemesh at Guy McIntyre,” Art in America, September, 1998.
Goodman, Jonathan, “Ophrah Shemesh at Baumgartner,” Art in America, February, 2003.	
Amy, Michaël J., “Ophrah Shemesh: Freight + Volume,” Art in America, November, 2008.
Cohen, David, “Deliciously Distressed,” New York Sun, March 13, 2008.

References

1952 births
20th-century American painters
21st-century American painters
Israeli painters
Iraqi Jews
Israeli people of Iraqi-Jewish descent
New York Studio School of Drawing, Painting and Sculpture alumni
New York Studio School of Drawing, Painting and Sculpture faculty
Bezalel Academy of Arts and Design alumni
Living people
American women painters
Israeli women painters
20th-century American women artists
21st-century American women artists
American women academics